Avery Skinner (June 9, 1796 – November 24, 1876) was an American politician from New York.

Life
He was born on June 9, 1796, in Westmoreland, Cheshire County, New Hampshire, the son of Timothy Skinner and Ruth (Warner) Skinner. In 1816, he removed to Watertown, New York. On June 9, 1822, he married Elizabeth Lathrop Huntington (1802–1833), and they had four children. In 1823, the family moved to a place which Skinner named Union Square (now a hamlet called Maple View), in the town of Mexico. Skinner built, and then kept, an inn at Union Square. From 1826 to 1837, he was Treasurer of Oswego County. From 1828 to 1839, he was an associate judge of the Oswego County Court.

He was a member of the New York State Assembly (Oswego Co.) in 1832 and 1833. He was Postmaster of Union Square from 1833 until his death, with a short interruption of three months.

On September 1, 1834, he married Charlotte Prior Stebbins (1802–1888), and they had five children, among them Congressman Charles R. Skinner (1844–1928).

Avery Skinner was a member of the New York State Senate (5th D.) from 1838 to 1841, sitting in the 61st, 62nd, 63rd and 64th New York State Legislatures.

He died on November 24, 1876, in Mexico, Oswego County, New York; and was buried at the Maple View Cemetery there.

State Senator Alanson Skinner (1794–1876) was his brother.

Sources
The New York Civil List compiled by Franklin Benjamin Hough (pages 132f, 145, 212, 214 and 304; Weed, Parsons and Co., 1858)
Skinner genealogy at Family Tree Maker

External links

1796 births
1876 deaths
Democratic Party New York (state) state senators
People from Westmoreland, New Hampshire
Politicians from Watertown, New York
Democratic Party members of the New York State Assembly
New York (state) postmasters
19th-century American politicians